Archibald Vivian Hill  (26 September 1886 – 3 June 1977), known as A. V. Hill, was a British physiologist, one of the founders of the diverse disciplines of biophysics and operations research. He shared the 1922 Nobel Prize in Physiology or Medicine for his elucidation of the production of heat and mechanical work in muscles.

Biography
Born in Bristol, he was educated at Blundell's School and graduated from Trinity College, Cambridge as third wrangler in the mathematics tripos before turning to physiology. While still an undergraduate at Trinity College, he derived in 1909 what came to be known as the Langmuir equation. 

This is closely related to Michaelis-Menten kinetics. In this paper, Hill's first publication, he derived both the equilibrium form of the Langmuir equation, and also the exponential approach to equilibrium. The paper, written under the supervision of John Newport Langley, is a landmark in the history of receptor theory, because the context for the derivation was the binding of nicotine and curare to the "receptive substance" at the neuromuscular junction.

While a student he had enrolled in the Officers Training Corps; he was a crack shot. In 1914, at the outbreak of the First World War, Hill became the musketry officer of the Cambridgeshire Regiment. The British made no effort to make use of their scientists. 

At the end of 1915, while home on leave he was asked by Horace Darwin from the Ministry of Munitions to come for a day to advise them on how to train anti-aircraft gunners. On site, Hill immediately proposed a simple two mirror method to determine airplanes' heights. Transferred to Munitions, he realized that the mirrors could measure where smoke shells burst and if he fitted this data with the equations describing a shell's flight they could provide accurate range tables for anti-aircraft guns. To measure and compute he assembled the Anti-Aircraft Experimental Section, a team of men too old for conscription, Ralph H. Fowler (a wounded officer), and lads too young for service including Douglas Hartree, Arthur Milne and James Crowther. Someone dubbed his motley group "Hill's Brigands", which they proudly adopted. Later in the war they also worked on locating enemy planes from their sound. He sped between their working sites on his beloved motorcycle. At the end of the war Major Hill issued certificates to more than one hundred Brigands. He was appointed an Officer of the Order of the British Empire (OBE).

In 1923 he succeeded Ernest Starling as professor of physiology at University College London, a few years later becoming a Royal Society Research professor there, where he remained until retirement in 1951. In 1933, he became with William Beveridge and Lord Rutherford a founder member and vice-president of the Academic Assistance Council (which in 1936 became the Society for the Protection of Science and Learning). By the start of the Second World War, the organisation had saved 900 academics (18 of whom went on to win Nobel Prizes) from Nazi persecution. He prominently displayed in his laboratory a toy figure of Adolf Hitler with saluting arm upraised, which he explained was in gratitude for all the scientists Germany had expelled, some of whom were now working with him. Hill believed that "Laughter is the best detergent for nonsense".

In 1935 he served with Patrick Blackett and Sir Henry Tizard on the committee that gave birth to radar. He was also biological secretary of the Royal Society; William Henry Bragg was president. Both had been frustrated by the delay in putting scientists to work in the previous war. The Royal Society collated a list of scientists and Hill represented the Society at the Ministry of Labour. When the war came Hill led a campaign to liberate refugee scientists who had been interned. He served as an independent Member of Parliament (MP) for Cambridge University from 1940 to 1945. In 1940 he was posted to the British Embassy in Washington to promote war research in the still neutral United States. He was authorized to swap secrets with the Americans, but this could not work: how do you place a value on another's secret? Hill saw the answer and persuaded the British to show the Americans everything they were working on (except for the atomic bomb). The mobilization of Allied scientists was one of the major successes in the war.

After the war he rebuilt his laboratory at University College and vigorously carried on research. In 1951 his advocacy was rewarded by the establishment of a Biophysics Department under his leadership. 

In 1952, he became head of the British Association for the Advancement of Science and Secretary General of the International Council of Scientific Unions. He was President of the Marine Biological Association from 1955 to 1960. In 1967 he retired to Cambridge where he gradually lost the use of his legs. He died "held in the greatest affection by more than a hundred scientific descendants all over the world".

Cooperativity of protein binding and enzyme kinetics 
Although Hill's work in muscle physiology is probably the most important, and certainly responsible for his Nobel Prize, he is also very well known in biochemistry for the Hill equation, which he used to quantify binding of oxygen to haemoglobin, written here as a kinetic equation, as it is mainly used for that:

Although many authors use  or  rather than   these symbols are misleading if taken to imply that it shows the number of binding sites on the protein. Hill himself avoided any such interpretation.

The equation can be rearranged as follows:

This shows that when the Hill equation is accurately obeyed (which usually it is not) a plot of  gives a straight line of slope . This is called a Hill plot.

Muscle physiology 
Hill made many exacting measurements of the heat released when skeletal muscles contract and relax. A key finding was that heat is produced during contraction, which requires investment of chemical energy, but not during relaxation, which is passive. His earliest measurements used equipment left behind by the Swedish physiologist Magnus Blix, Hill measured a temperature rise of only 0.003 °C. After publication he learned that German physiologists had already reported on heat and muscle contraction and he went to Germany to learn more about their work. He continually improved his apparatus to make it more sensitive and to reduce the time lag between the heat released by the preparation and its recording by his thermocouple. 
 
Hill is regarded, along with Hermann Helmholtz, as one of the founders of biophysics.

Hill returned briefly to Cambridge in 1919 before taking the chair in physiology at the Victoria University of Manchester in 1920 in succession to William Stirling. Using himself as the subject he ran every morning from 7:15 to 10:30  he showed that running a dash relies on energy stores which afterwards are replenished by increased oxygen consumption. Paralleling the work of German Otto Fritz Meyerhof, Hill elucidated the processes whereby mechanical work is produced in muscles. The two shared the 1922 Nobel Prize in Physiology and Medicine for this work. Hill introduced the concepts of maximal oxygen uptake and oxygen debt in 1922.

Personal life
In 1913 he married Margaret Neville Keynes (1885-1974), daughter of the economist John Neville Keynes, and sister of the economist John Maynard Keynes and the surgeon Geoffrey Keynes. They had two sons and two daughters:

 Polly Hill (1914–2005), economist, married K.A.C. Humphreys, registrar of the West African Examinations Council.
David Keynes Hill (1915–2002), physiologist, married Stella Mary Humphrey
Maurice Hill (1919–1966), oceanographer, married Philippa Pass
 Janet Hill (1918–2000) child psychiatrist, married the immunologist John Herbert Humphrey.

Honors and awards
 Officer of the Order of the British Empire (1918)
 Fellow of the Royal Society (1918)
 Nobel Prize in Physiology or Medicine (1922)
 In 1926 he was invited to deliver the Royal Institution Christmas Lecture on Nerves and Muscles: How We Feel and Move.
 Associate Fellow in the National Academy of Kinesiology (1938)
 Companion of Honour (1946)
 Copley Medal of the Royal Society (1948)
 President of the British Association (1952)

Blue plaque

On 9 September 2015 an English Heritage Blue plaque was erected at Hill's former home, 16 Bishopswood Road, Highgate, where he had lived from 1923 to 1967. Since then the house had been divided into flats and owned by Highgate School, where Hill was a Governor from 1929 to 1960. It has now been sold, redeveloped and renamed as Hurstbourne. In Hill's time, according to his grandson Nicholas Humphrey, regular guests at the house included 18 exiled Nobel laureates, his brother-in-law, the economist John Maynard Keynes, and friends Stephen Hawking and Sigmund Freud. After-dinner conversations in the drawing room would inevitably involve passionate debates about science or politics. "Every Sunday we would have to attend a tea party at grandpa’s house and apart from entertaining some extraordinary guests, he would devise some great games for us, such as frog racing in the garden or looking through the lens of a (dissected) sheep’s eye". Sir Ralph Kohn FRS who proposed the Blue plaque, said: "The Nobel Prize winner A. V. Hill contributed vastly to our understanding of muscle physiology.  His work has resulted in wide-ranging application in sports medicine. As an outstanding Humanitarian and Parliamentarian, he was uncompromising in his condemnation of the Nazi regime for its persecution of scientists and others. A. V. Hill played a crucial role in assisting and rescuing many refugees to continue their work in this country".

Publications
By Hill:

Hill, A.V. (1924–25). Textbook of Anti-Aircraft Gunnery, 2 vols

- (1927a). Muscular Movement in Man
- (1927b). Living Machinery

- (1932) Chemical Wave Transmission in Nerve

References

Sources

External links 

 The Papers of A. V. Hill held at Churchill Archives Centre

1886 births
1977 deaths
Academics of the Victoria University of Manchester
Academics of University College London
Alumni of Trinity College, Cambridge
British Army personnel of World War I
English biophysicists
English Nobel laureates
English physiologists
Fellows of the Royal Society
Foreign associates of the National Academy of Sciences
Keynes family
Members of the Parliament of the United Kingdom for the University of Cambridge
Members of the Order of the Companions of Honour
Nobel laureates in Physiology or Medicine
Officers of the Order of the British Empire
British operations researchers
People educated at Blundell's School
Scientists from Bristol
Recipients of the Copley Medal
Royal Medal winners
Sports scientists
UK MPs 1935–1945
Cambridgeshire Regiment officers
Jodrell Professors of Physiology
Military personnel from Bristol